Nico Schulz (born 1 April 1993) is a German professional footballer who plays as a left-back for Bundesliga club Borussia Dortmund and the Germany national team.

Club career
Schulz played for BSC Rehberge Berlin until 2000 before joining Hertha BSC at the age of seven. He performed convincingly as a youth player, attracting the attention of scouts from Liverpool whose offers he eventually refused. In the following years he played for Hertha's youth teams and reached the final of the U19 DFB-Pokal in 2009–10, but lost 1–2 against 1899 Hoffenheim.

In the following summer break, Schulz joined the training camp with the professional players. He made his first competitive match for the first team in the first round of the DFB-Pokal against SC Pfullendorf with a 2–0 win on 14 August 2010, coming on as a substitute for Valeri Domovchiyski in the 81st minute. Over the next two seasons, Schulz became a regular substitute and occasional starter. He scored his first goal for Hertha BSC on 30 March 2013 against VfL Bochum.

On 18 August 2015, Schulz joined Borussia Mönchengladbach on a four-year deal. In 2017, he signed a three-year contract with 1899 Hoffenheim.

On 22 May 2019, Schulz joined Borussia Dortmund, along with Julian Brandt and Thorgan Hazard.

International career
Schulz was called up to the full Germany squad for the first time on 29 August 2018, for Germany's opening 2018–19 UEFA Nations League match against France and the friendly against Peru. He made his international début in the latter match, scoring the game-winning goal in the 85th minute. He was also eligible to play for Italy through his father, who hails from Ischia.

Personal life
His brother Gian Luca Schulz is also a professional footballer.

Career statistics

Club

International

Scores and results list Germany's goal tally first, score column indicates score after each Schulz goal.

Honours
Hertha BSC
 2. Bundesliga: 2010–11

Borussia Dortmund
 DFB-Pokal: 2020–21
 DFL-Supercup: 2019

Individual
 kicker Bundesliga Team of the Season: 2018–19

References

External links
 Profile at the Borussia Dortmund website
 
 
 
 
 

1993 births
Living people
German people of Italian descent
Footballers from Berlin
German footballers
Association football defenders
Germany international footballers
Germany youth international footballers
Germany under-21 international footballers
Bundesliga players
2. Bundesliga players
Hertha BSC players
Hertha BSC II players
Borussia Mönchengladbach players
TSG 1899 Hoffenheim players
Borussia Dortmund players